The list of rivers of Texas is a list of all named waterways, including rivers and streams that partially pass through or are entirely located within the U.S. state of Texas. All of the state's waterways drain towards the Mississippi River, the Texas Gulf Coast, or the Rio Grande, with mouths located in seven major estuaries.

Major waterways
Angelina River
Blanco River
Bosque River
Brazos River
Colorado River
Concho River
Canadian River
Guadalupe River
James River
Lampasas River
Lavaca River
Leon River
Little River
Llano River
Navidad River
Neches River
Nolan River
Nueces River
Frio River
Paluxy River
Pease River
Pedernales River
Prairie Dog Town Fork Red River
Red River
Rio Grande
Devils River
Pecos River
Sabine River
San Antonio River
Medina River
San Bernard River
San Gabriel River
San Jacinto River
San Marcos River
San Saba River
Sulphur River
Trinity River
Wichita River
White River

Seasonal and restrictive waterways
Aransas River
Armand Bayou
Arroyo Colorado
Attoyac Bayou
Austin Bayou
Barton Creek
Bastrop Bayou
Bedias Creek
Beech Creek
Big Cow Creek
Big Cypress Bayou
Big Cypress Creek
Big Mineral Creek
Big Pine Creek
Big Sandy Creek
Bois D'Arc Creek
Buffalo Bayou
Caney Creek (Red River tributary)
Catfish Creek
Cedar Bayou
Chacon Creek
Cibolo Creek
Clear Creek
Coffee Mill Creek
Coleto Creek
Comal River
Buffalo Soldier Draw
Denton Creek
Dickinson Bayou
Double Bayou, East Fork
Garcitas Creek
Marcado Creek
Highland Bayou
Hurst Creek
Keechi Creek
Lake Charlotte Creek (Lake Pass)
Little Cypress Bayou
Navasota River
Onion Creek
Oso Creek
Oyster Bayou
Oyster Creek
Palo Pinto Creek
Pecan Bayou
Pine Island Bayou
Rainwater Creek
Rincon Bayou
Sabinal River
Salado Creek
Sanders Creek
Spring Creek
Taylor Bayou
Turkey Creek
Village Creek
Walnut Branch
Zacate Creek

Waterways by drainage basin
This list is arranged by drainage basin, with tributaries indented under each larger stream's name listed in order from mouth to source.

Mississippi River

Mississippi River (LA, AR)
Red River
Cross Bayou
Twelvemile Bayou (LA)
Black Bayou
Big Cypress Bayou
Little Cypress Bayou
Black Cypress Bayou
Big Cypress Creek
Sulphur River
White Oak Creek
North Sulphur River
South Sulphur River
Pecan Bayou
Big Pine Creek
Sanders Creek
Bois D'Arc Creek
Coffee Mill Creek
Caney Creek (Red River tributary)
Washita River
Big Mineral Creek
Little Wichita River
Wichita River
Holliday Creek
Beaver Creek
North Wichita River
Middle Fork Wichita River
South Wichita River
Pease River
Catfish Creek
North Pease River
Quitaque Creek
Middle Pease River
Tongue River
Wanderers Creek
Groesbeck Creek
North Fork Red River
Elm Fork Red River
Sweetwater Creek
McClellan Creek
Salt Fork Red River
Prairie Dog Town Fork Red River
Buck Creek
Mulberry Creek
Tule Creek
Little Red River (Texas)
Palo Duro Creek
Tierra Blanca Creek
Arkansas River (AR, OK)
Canadian River
North Canadian River
Beaver River
Kiowa Creek
Palo Duro Creek
Coldwater Creek
Wolf Creek
Punta de Agua Creek
Rita Blanca Creek
Carrizo Creek (New Mexico/Texas)

Gulf of Mexico Coastal

Sabine River
Big Cow Creek
Big Sandy Creek
Lake Fork Creek
Rainwater Creek
Neches River
Pine Island Bayou
Village Creek
Beech Creek
Big Sandy Creek
Angelina River
Ayish Bayou
Attoyac Bayou
Mud Creek
Piney Creek
Taylor Bayou
Oyster Bayou
Double Bayou
Double Bayou, East Fork
West Fork Double Bayou

Trinity River
Lake Charlotte Creek (Lake Pass)
Bedias Creek
Keechi Creek
Tehuacana Creek
Richland Creek
Chambers Creek
Cedar Creek
Kings Creek
Red Oak Creek
East Fork Trinity River
White Rock Creek
Turtle Creek
Elm Fork Trinity River
Bachman Branch
Denton Creek
Clear Creek
Furneaux Creek
Isle du Bois Creek
Range Creek
West Fork Trinity River
Johnson Creek
Clear Fork Trinity River
Big Sandy Creek
Cedar Bayou

San Jacinto River
Buffalo Bayou
Vince Bayou
Whiteoak Bayou
Brays Bayou
East Fork San Jacinto River
Peach Creek
Caney Creek (San Jacinto River tributary)
West Fork San Jacinto River
Spring Creek
Cypress Creek
Lake Creek
Clear Creek
Armand Bayou
Dickinson Bayou
Highland Bayou
Chocolate Bayou
Bastrop Bayou
Cow Bayou
Austin Bayou
Oyster Creek

Brazos River
Mill Creek
Navasota River
Yegua Creek
Nolan River
Little Brazos River
Little River
San Gabriel River
Brushy Creek
Leon River
Lampasas River
Cowhouse Creek
Sabana River
Tehuacana Creek
Bosque River
North Bosque River
East Bosque River
Mustang Creek
South Bosque River
Middle Bosque River
Aquilla Creek
Paluxy River
Palo Pinto Creek
Clear Fork Brazos River
Hubbard Creek
Paint Creek
Elm Creek
Sweetwater Creek
Elm Creek
Millers Creek
Double Mountain Fork Brazos River
North Fork Double Mountain Fork Brazos River
Blackwater Draw
Yellow House Draw
Yellow House Canyon
Salt Fork Brazos River
Croton Creek
Duck Creek
White River
Running Water Draw
San Bernard River
Caney Creek (Matagorda Bay)

Colorado River
Cummins Creek
Bull Creek
Onion Creek
Barton Creek
Pedernales River
Llano River
Gentry Creek
North Llano River
South Llano River
San Saba River
Brady Creek
Pecan Bayou
Jim Ned Creek
Home Creek
Loss Creek
Concho River
Kickapoo Creek
North Concho River
South Concho River
Spring Creek (Tom Green County, Texas)
Middle Concho River
Beals Creek
Mustang Draw
Johnson Draw
McKenzie Draw
Monument Draw
Seminole Draw
Sulphur Springs Draw
Tres Palacios Creek
Garancahua Creek
Lavaca River
Navidad River
Sandy Creek
Garcitas Creek

Guadalupe River
San Antonio River
Cibolo Creek
Martinez Creek
Woman Hollering Creek
Kicaster Creek
Calaveras Creek
Medina River
Coker Creek
Salado Creek
Rosillo Creek
Coleto Creek
Sandies Creek
Peach Creek
San Marcos River
Blanco River
Comal River
Capano Creek
Mission River
Blanco Creek
Medio Creek
Aransas River

Nueces River
Frio River
Atascosa River
San Miguel Creek
Leona River
Hondo Creek
Tehuacana Creek
Sabinal River
Blanco Creek
Turkey Creek
West Nueces River
Rincon Bayou
Oso Creek
Petronila Creek
San Fernando Creek
Santa Gertrudis Creek
Carreta Creek
Los Olmos Creek
Arroyo Colorado

Rio Grande

Rio Grande
Brownsville Ship Channel
Devils River
Dry Devils River
Pecos River
Howard Draw
Independence Creek
Tunas Creek
Coyansa Draw
Toyah Creek
Barilla Draw
Salt Draw
Delaware River
San Francisco Creek
Maravillas Creek
Terlingua Creek
Calamity Creek
Alamito Creek
Chacon Creek
San Ygnacio Creek
Zacate Creek
San Ildefonso Creek
Sombrerillito Creek
Santa Isabel Creek

10 longest rivers
Of the following 10 rivers, all empty into the Gulf of Mexico. Four of the rivers are tributaries: The Pecos flows into the Rio Grande, the Red into the Mississippi River, and the Sabine and Neches flow into Sabine Lake which is connected to the Gulf of Mexico by Sabine Pass. The Canadian is a tributary of a tributary and flows into the Arkansas River which is itself a tributary of the Mississippi.

Rio Grande – ,  of which are in Texas (although technically on the border between Texas and Mexico)
Pecos River –  most of which is in New Mexico
Trinity River –  entirely in Texas
Neches River –  entirely in Texas
Nueces River –  entirely in Texas

The Trinity River is the longest river with its entire drainage basin in Texas. The Colorado is the longest river with both its source based on river name and its mouth in the state. The actual longest source of the Colorado is in New Mexico.

Shortest river
The Comal River is the shortest river in the state of Texas and the fifth-shortest river in the United States. Located entirely within the city limits of New Braunfels in Central Texas, its spring-fed waters run a distance of 2.5 miles (4 kilometers).

See also

List of rivers in the United States
List of geographical regions in Texas

External links
The Handbook of Texas Online: Texas History Quiz -- Texas Rivers

References

USGS Geographic Names Information Service
USGS Hydrologic Unit Map - State of Texas (1974)

Texas rivers

Rivers